Plaza Hotel is a historic hotel building located at Trenton, Grundy County, Missouri.  It was built in 1929–1930, and is a five-story, Art Deco style reinforced concrete building. The building measures approximately  It has a pre-cast, concrete block exterior, concrete roof and floors.

It was listed on the National Register of Historic Places in 2001.

References

Hotel buildings on the National Register of Historic Places in Missouri
Art Deco architecture in Missouri
Hotel buildings completed in 1930
Buildings and structures in Grundy County, Missouri
National Register of Historic Places in Grundy County, Missouri